Clostridium leptum is a bacterium species in the genus Clostridium.

It forms a subgroup of human fecal microbiota.  Its reduction relative to other members of the gut microbiota has been observed in patients with inflammatory bowel disease.

The genome of C. leptum has been sequenced.

References

External links 

Type strain of Clostridium leptum at BacDive -  the Bacterial Diversity Metadatabase

Gut flora bacteria
Bacteria described in 1976
leptum